This is a list of types of watercraft which have seen naval use.

Sailing vessel types
Barque
Barquentine
Bireme
Bomb vessel
Brig
Brigantine
Caravel
Clipper
Cog
Corvette
Cutter
Dromon
Flyboat
Frigate
Full-rigged ship
Galley
Galleon
Hulk
Junk
Liburnian
Longship
Man-of-war
Quadrireme
Quinquereme
Rocket vessel
Schooner
Ship of the line
Sloop-of-war
Trireme
Xebec

Modern vessel types
Aircraft carrier
Anti-submarine warfare carrier
Helicopter carrier 
Air-cushioned landing craft
Amphibious assault ship
Battlecruiser
Battleship
Pocket battleship
CAM ship
Corvette
Cruiser
Armored cruiser
Light cruiser
Heavy cruiser 
Aircraft cruiser 
Destroyer
Dreadnought
Escort aircraft carrier
Frigate
Steam frigates, including steam sloops and corvettes
Fast attack craft
Gunboat
Hospital ship
Hydrofoil
Ironclad
Landing craft
Littoral combat ship
Mine planter
Minesweeper
Missile boat
Monitor (warship)
Patrol boat
Torpedo boat
Patrol Torpedo (PT) boat
Q-ship
Seaplane tender
Submarine including U-boat
Submarine aircraft carrier
Submarine chaser
Survey ship
Troopship

Lists of ships
Lists of watercraft types